Hershel of Ostropol (Little Hersh of Ostropol; 1757–1811) is a prominent figure in Jewish humor. Hershel was a prankster from Ostropol, Crown Poland (now  Ukraine), who lived in poverty and targeted the rich and powerful, both Jew and Gentile. Common folks were not safe from his shenanigans, either, but usually got off lightly. He is also remembered by Ukrainian Gentiles as something of an ethnic folk hero, who could take on establishment forces much larger than himself with nothing but his humor.

Hershel was originally a shochet who, having offended some of his townspeople with his humor, left, wandered, and "found his calling" as court jester of the Baal Shem Tov's grandson. Publicity for the transition to reputation as a jokester is traced to a 1920s writer named Chaim Bloch and a book he wrote.

Overview
While his exploits have been mythologized over the years, the character of Hershele is based on a historic figure, who lived in what is today Ukraine during the late 18th or early 19th century. He may have used his wits to get by, eventually earning a permanent position as court jester of sorts to Rabbi Boruch of Medzhybizh.

In the Hershele stories, he was chosen by members of Rabbi Boruch's court in order to counter the rebbe's notorious fits of temper and lift his chronic melancholy.

It is believed that Hershele died of an accident that was brought about by one of Rabbi Boruch's fits of anger. Hershele lingered for several days and died in Rabbi Boruch's own bed surrounded by Rabbi Boruch and his followers. He is thought to be buried in the old Jewish cemetery in Medzhybizh, though his grave is unmarked.

Hershele was the subject of several epic poems, a novel, a comedy performed in 1930 by the Vilna Troupe, and a US TV program in the 1950s. Two illustrated children's books, The Adventures of Hershel of Ostropol, and Hershel and the Hanukkah Goblins, have been published. Both books were written by Eric Kimmel and illustrated by Trina Schart Hyman.

A tale about him, When Hershel Eats by Nathan Ausubel, was included in Joanna Cole's 1982 work, Best-Loved Folktales of the World.

In 2002, a play entitled Hershele the Storyteller was performed in New York City.

In 1999, Shari Aronson of Z Puppets Rosenschnoz received permission from Eric Kimmel to adapt the book Hershel and the Hanukkah Goblins for the stage. This adaptation has since been produced four times by Minnesota Jewish Theatre Company, with puppets by Chris Griffith winning a 2009 MN Ivey Award, and multiple times by theater companies and Jewish Community Centers across the U.S.

Tales and examples

The Goose
When Hershele was a child, he had a number of brothers and sisters, of whom he was the smallest. Thus, whenever they had a meal, he'd be the last to get anything. As a result, whenever they had goose, he never got to eat a foot, which was his favorite part. One evening, he snuck into the kitchen before dinner and cut a foot off of the goose, slipping it under his shirt to hide.
During dinner, his father noticed that Hershele's shirt was grease-stained and that the goose's left foot was missing.
-	"Hershele," he said. "Did you take the goose's foot?"
-	"No, father," he said. "Maybe it was a one-footed goose."
-	"A one-footed goose? There's no such thing!"
-	"Sure there is. I'll take you to see one after dinner."
That evening, Hershele took his father out to a lake near their village. A flock of geese were sleeping on the banks, each tucking one foot into its body so that only the other was visible.
-	"There's one," said Hershele, pointing. Thinking to outsmart his son, his father clapped, waking the goose and causing it to lower its other leg.
-	"There. Now, Hershele, will you admit that you stole-"
-	"Wow, father! You just clapped and the goose grew a foot! Why didn't you do that to the one at the table?"

My Father
Hershele was traveling along the road when he came to a small inn. He went up to the door and politely asked if he could have a bite to eat and a pile of hay in the stables on which to rest for the night. The innkeeper and his wife refused.
-	"Oh, really, you're going to say no to me?" snapped Hershel.
-	"Y-yes," stammered the innkeeper, beginning to get worried.
-	"You know what happens if you refuse me? I do what my father did when someone said no to him! Do you want me to do what my father did? Do you? Do you?"
-	"Give him what he wants," hissed the innkeeper's wife into his ear. "He's clearly insane. I don't know what his father did, but it must be something terrible!"
Agreeing with his wife, the innkeeper allowed Hershele to stay for the night, going so far as to offer him a large meal and a place at their table. After dinner, he offered Hershele one of his finest rooms, to which the vagabond happily agreed.
-	"So," he said as the dishes were cleared away. "Now that everything is settled, I'm curious: what did your father do?"
-	"Well, since you ask so nicely, I'll tell you," Hershele replied. "When my father was alone starving on the road, and he was refused anything to eat, why he'd go to bed hungry!"

Rolls and Doughnuts
Hershele once entered a restaurant and asked for two rolls. When these were brought to him he changed his mind, asked for two doughnuts instead, ate them, then walked out without paying. The owner ran after him and demanded to be paid for the doughnuts. 
-	“But I gave you the rolls for them,” Hershele said. 
-	“You didn’t pay for the rolls, either,” the owner said. 
-	“Well, I haven’t eaten the rolls, have I?” Hershele replied and walked away.

Good Manners
One time Hershele and a vagabond friend bought two loaves of bread. Hershele picked them up from the baker, then handed the smaller one to his friend and kept the larger one for himself. 
-	“This is very impolite,” his friend said. 
-	“What would you have done if you were me?” Hershele asked. 
-	“I’d give you the large loaf and keep the small one, of course!” The friend said. 
-	“Well, you’ve got the small one. Now what do you want?”

On a Dare
On a dare to slap a hated man in his Jewish hometown, Hershele did just that, unprovoked. When the man asked him why he did this, Hershele replied that he thought the man was Berel. 
-	“And if I’m Berel,” said the offended man, “does this give you the right to hit me?” 
-	 “Keep your nose out of my and Berel’s affairs,” Hershele replied.

The Pig
During the feast of Passover, Hershele once sat across from a self-absorbed rich man who made derogatory remarks about Hershele’s eating habits. 
-	“What separates you from a pig, is what I’d like to know,” the man said derisively. 
-	“The table,” Hershele replied.

The Painting
Once, Hershele was selling antiques and trinkets in the market. Among his wares was a large canvas, that was entirely blank. A customer asked Hershele what it was, and Hershele replied:
-	"For a silver ruble, I will tell you about this painting. (The man, overwhelmed by curiosity, gives him a silver ruble). Well, this painting is a famous painting, The Jews Pursued by the Egyptians Crossed the Red Sea."
-	"Well, where are the Jews?"
-	"They've crossed."
-	"And the Egyptians?"
-	"Haven't come yet."
-	(Getting frustrated at having been duped) "And where's the Red Sea?!"
-	"It's parted, dummkopf!"

The Hat
A story from Kehilalinks:
Hershele was visiting a distant town. The local Polish lord rode in. The locals removed their hats and bowed. Hershel stood still.
"Where are you from?" the nobleman asked. 
 "From Ostropol" Hershele answered.
"What about the hat?" asked the lord.
 "The hat too is from Ostropol."

The Rich Miser
Hershele was once collecting alms in a large town. The local gvir (rich man) rebuffed him rudely. Hershele responded with a smile, and said "I am sure you will remain wealthy your whole life". The gvir was confused and asked "why?" Hershele said, "Well, even a pauper like me who accidentally drops a few kopeks in the outhouse pit will not bother to fish them out of the waste. Berel, who is a little richer than me, would do the same for a few rubles even. So if the Lord of hosts, who has said "mine is silver, and mine is the gold" dropped fifty thousand rubles into you, He will certainly leave it there."

See also
 Hitar Petar
Motke Chabad
 Nasreddin
 Păcală
 Till Eulenspiegel

References 

Jewish comedy and humor
Jewish literature
Jewish society
People from Medzhybizh
Jesters
Ukrainian folklore
Ukrainian entertainers
Humor and wit characters
Clowns
1757 births
1811 deaths
Yiddish-language folklore
European folklore characters
Ukrainian Jews
Jews from the Russian Empire